Vaazhkai Chakkaram is a 1990 Indian Tamil-language action drama film directed by Manivannan. The film stars Sathyaraj, Gautami, Goundamani and Vinu Chakravarthy. The film, produced and written by Tirupur Mani, was released on 9 February 1990.

Plot 

Thangavelu is a sub-inspector in his home town which leads to its own set of problems. His father is overly involved in his job. Furthermore, Thangavelu- related to nearly everyone in town — finds it difficult to arrest anyone who breaks the law. His uncle, Saaraya Kadai Kounder, is the village president and deeply involved in many illegal activities including smuggling. Thangavelu arrests his son Periyasamy which fuels a feud between the families. When the local matchmaker shows both Periyasamy and Thangavelu as prospective grooms to Kalyani, she chooses Thangavelu further straining ties between the families. Kalyani and Thangavelu are engaged while Saaraya Kadai Kounder arranges for Periyasamy to marry Thaaiyamma. She's the daughter of the highly respected but completely broke Jamindar Doraisamy. He's aware of Periyasamy's faults but feels he has no other options for his daughter's marriage. Sadasiva Kounder stops Thangavelu and Kalyani's wedding because her father cannot give the dowry he requested. Thangavelu is incensed as he does not condone the dowry system. He convinces his father and as they head to the wedding, the bus crashes. No one is killed but this delays their arrival significantly. Kalyani's father thinks this was a deliberate act by Sadasiva and commits suicide out of humiliation. Thangavelu arrives too late to stop this and Kalyani can't bring herself to forgive Thangavelu despite his explanations. Her family leaves town and she becomes a cop to support her family and lands a position in Thangavelu's station. He's still in love with her while she's still dealing with very conflicting emotions. Thaaiyamma, meanwhile, is suffering in her husband's home. She's abused emotionally and physically by Saaraya Kadai kounder's family. Thangavelu and Kalyani investigate a domestic abuse complaint but Thaaiyamma refuses to co-operate. Her father also refuses to intervene citing the social mores. Thaaiyamma witnesses Saaraya Kadai Kounder murder a maid and is deeply disturbed. Thangavelu arrests him based on other evidence enraging him. Thaaiyamma finds herself in even more danger while Thangavelu and Kalyani must deal with their personal feelings as well as Saaraya Kadai Kounder's wrath.

Cast 

 Sathyaraj as Thangavelu
 Gautami as Kalyani
 Goundamani as Ramasamy
 Jai Ganesh as Saaraya Kadai Kounder
 Vinu Chakravarthy as Sadasiva Kounder
 Raja as Thangavelu's brother
 Sundar. C as Constable
 Vasu as Amavasai
 Meesai Murugesan as Constable
 Vijay Krishnaraj as Jamindar Doraisamy
 Sabitha Anand as Thaaiyamma
 Manivannan as Kalyani's father (Cameo appearance)

Soundtrack 
The soundtrack was composed by Shankar–Ganesh.

Reception 
P. S. S. of Kalki called the film old food with new decoration.

References

External links 
 

1990 films
1990s action drama films
1990s Tamil-language films
Films directed by Manivannan
Films scored by Shankar–Ganesh
Indian action drama films